1,2-Dichloro-2-nitrosopropane is a chlorinated nitrosoalkane. It's a deep blue liquid with powerful lachrymatory effects.

See also
Chloropicrin
Trifluoronitrosomethane
Trichloronitrosomethane

References

Nitroso compounds
Organochlorides
Lachrymatory agents
Pulmonary agents